"Silent Prayer" is a song by American singer-songwriter Shanice featuring Johnny Gill. It was released in April 1992 as the third single from her debut album, Inner Child (1991). The song peaked at number 31 on the US Billboard Hot 100 and number four on the Billboard Hot R&B/Hip-Hop Songs chart.

Critical reception
Michael Eric Dyson from Rolling Stone remarked that on the song, "Shanice is supported by Johnny Gill's earthy melisma."

Track listing
 7" single
A1. "Silent Prayer"
B1. "Loving You"

 12" single
A1. Radio Edit
A2. Full Version
B1. Instrumental

Charts

Weekly charts

Year-end charts

Notes and references

1992 singles
Shanice songs
Johnny Gill songs
Songs written by Narada Michael Walden
Song recordings produced by Narada Michael Walden
Songs written by Jeffrey E. Cohen
1990 songs
Motown singles